Chabot may refer to:

People
André Chabot, politician in Calgary, Alberta, Canada
Anthony Chabot (1813–1888), Canadian-American engineer and entrepreneur
Arlette Chabot (born 1951), French journalist and political commentator
Aurore Chabot (born 1949), American ceramist
Bart Chabot (born 1954), Dutch poet and writer
Benoît Chabot (1911–2006), independent member of the Canadian House of Commons
Charles Chabot (1815–1882), English graphologist
Christiane Chabot (born 1950), French-Canadian artist
François Chabot (1756–1794), French revolutionist
Frédéric Chabot (born 1968), Canadian former professional ice hockey goaltender
Georges Antoine Chabot (1758–1819), French jurist and statesman
Hendrikus Chabot (1894-1949), Dutch painter and sculptor
Henri Chabot (1616–1655), French nobleman who became Duke of Rohan
Herbert Chabot (1931–2022), senior judge of the United States Tax Court
James Chabot (1927–1989), Canadian politician and British Columbia cabinet minister 1963-1986
Jean Chabot (1806–1860), lawyer, judge and political figure in Canada East
Jean-Baptiste Chabot (1860–1948), French Roman Catholic secular priest and Syriac scholar
Jean-Philip Chabot (born 1988), Canadian professional ice hockey player
Jesse Chabot, Canadian screenwriter
John Chabot (born 1962), Canadian former professional ice hockey player
John Léo Chabot (1869–1936), Canadian parliamentarian and surgeon
Lorne Chabot (1900–1946), Canadian ice hockey goaltender
Louis François Jean Chabot (1757–1837), French general of the Napoleonic Wars
Paul Chabot (born 1974), California politician and military officer
Philippe de Chabot (c.1492–1543), Admiral of France
Steve Chabot (born 1953), member of the U.S. House of Representatives
Thomas Chabot (born 1997), Canadian ice hockey defenceman

Places
Chabot Museum, Rotterdam, Netherlands, dedicated to the Dutch painter and sculptor Hendrik Chabot
Chabot Park, neighborhood in Oakland, California
Anthony Chabot Regional Park, California
James Chabot Provincial Park, British Columbia, Canada
Lake Chabot, man-made lake in Alameda County, California

Organisations
Chabot Space and Science Center, a public science center and planetarium in Oakland, California
Chabot College, a public community college in Hayward, California
 Chabot Mobility, a mobility startup headquartered in Seoul, South Korea

Other uses
12675 Chabot (1980 TA4), main-belt asteroid
In heraldry, a kind of fish on coats of arms, usually spelled chalbot in English